Houssen Abderrahmane (born 3 February 1995) is a professional footballer who plays as a defender for Marignane Gignac. Born in France, he represents the Mauritania national team.

Club career
In July 2020, Abderrahmane signed with Belgian First Division B club RWDM on a one-year contract, with an option for an additional year.

On 29 August 2021, he joined Francs Borains in the Belgian third tier. He made his competitive debut for the club on 12 September in a league game against La Louvière Centre, also scoring his first goal to secure a 2–0 win for his side.

International career
Abderrahmane debuted for the Mauritania national team in 2016.

References

External links
 
 
 
 US Raon Profile

1995 births
Living people
People from Creil
Sportspeople from Oise
French sportspeople of Mauritanian descent
Citizens of Mauritania through descent
Mauritanian footballers
French footballers
Footballers from Hauts-de-France
Challenger Pro League players
Mauritania international footballers
Championnat National 2 players
Championnat National 3 players
Association football defenders
Louhans-Cuiseaux FC players
US Raon-l'Étape players
RWDM47 players
Francs Borains players
Marignane Gignac Côte Bleue FC players
2021 Africa Cup of Nations players
Mauritanian expatriate footballers
French expatriate footballers
Mauritanian expatriate sportspeople in Belgium
French expatriate sportspeople in Belgium
Expatriate footballers in Belgium